Gallant Sons is a 1940 American mystery film directed by George B. Seitz and written by William R. Lipman and Marion Parsonnet. The film stars Jackie Cooper, Bonita Granville, Gail Patrick, Gene Reynolds, June Preisser, Ian Hunter, Leo Gorcey, William Tracy and El Brendel. The film was released on November 15, 1940, by Metro-Goldwyn-Mayer.

Plot
Two boys, Johnny Davis and Byron "By" Newbold, are best friends. Their fathers, however, are not.  By’s father is in charge of the local paper and usually confronts Johnny’s father about suspicious activity putting the boys at odds with one another.

Cast 
 Jackie Cooper as Byron 'By' Newbold
 Bonita Granville as Kate Pendleton
 Gail Patrick as Clare Pendleton
 Gene Reynolds as Johnny Davis
 June Preisser as Dolly Matson
 Ian Hunter as 'Natural' Davis
 Leo Gorcey as 'Doc' Reardon
 William Tracy as 'Beefy' Monrose
 El Brendel as Olaf Larsen
 Tommy Kelly as Harwood 'Woody' Hollister
 Edward Ashley-Cooper as Al Posna
 Minor Watson as Barton Newbold
 Ferike Boros as Madame Wachek
 Charlotte Wynters as Estelle
 Don Douglas as Hackberry
 George Lessey as Judge

References

External links 
 
 
 
 

1940 films
American mystery films
1940 mystery films
Metro-Goldwyn-Mayer films
Films directed by George B. Seitz
American black-and-white films
1940s English-language films
1940s American films